The Justice Resource Institute (JRI) is a nonprofit organization based in Boston, Massachusetts, that provides outpatient specialty mental health services to disadvantaged, under-served and severely impacted youth and adults.

Community services
The JRI has been involved in providing the following services:
 HIV case management
 Sex offender treatment (cancelled in 2003)
 Outreach services to homeless youth

References

External links 
 Homepage

Non-profit organizations based in Boston
Community organizations
Mental health organizations in Massachusetts